The 1999 Wong Tai Sin District Council election was held on 28 November 1999 to elect all 25 elected members to the 29-member District Council.

Overall election results
Before election:

Change in composition:

References

External links

1999 Hong Kong local elections